Telangana is one of the 29 states in India, located in southern part of India. The State comprises 31 districts covering an area of 1,12,077 km2 (44,273 sq. mi). The largest district is Bhadradri Kothagudem where as Hyderabad is the smallest.

Full list of Colleges

 
Lists of buildings and structures in Telangana
Telangana